Acacia diaphyllodinea is a shrub belonging to the genus Acacia and the subgenus Phyllodineae. It is native to an area in the Goldfields-Esperance region of Western Australia.

It blooms from June to September and produces yellow flowers.

See also
List of Acacia species

References

diaphyllodinea
Acacias of Western Australia
Taxa named by Bruce Maslin